Rascal in Paradise is an album by O-Shen released in 2002.

Track listing
 Lumbo Chant - 1:01
 Lonely Souljah - 3:24
 Lus Tingting featuring "the Chief" - 4:26
 Throw Away the Gun - 4:14
 Carry On Rootsman - 4:24
 I Tried (Bad Girl) featuring Fiji - 4:02
 Cool Fever - 3:33
 Mi Laik Kam with Apox - 3:28
 God Bless Family - 3:57
 I Need a Girl - 4:03
 Siasi - 2:57

In media
The song, "Throw Away the Gun", is featured in the 2004 film 50 First Dates.

References

2002 albums
O-Shen albums